This article lists current and former justices of the Supreme Court of Zimbabwe.

List of justices

Chief justices

All justices 
The following table lists all former justices of the Supreme Court of Zimbabwe, including both chief justices and puisne justices. The list also includes former Rhodesian justices who remained on the bench after independence in 1980. For the Rhodesian justices, the appointment date indicates the date they were appointed to the High Court of Rhodesia, which was superseded by the Supreme Court of Zimbabwe. The start date of the Rhodesian justices' tenure, however, is 18 April 1980, the date that the Supreme Court of Zimbabwe came into being.

References 

Judiciary of Zimbabwe
Zimbabwe
justices
 
Supreme Court of Zimbabwe